Travancore Mathew Thomas Isaac (born 26 September 1952) is an Indian politician and economist, who served as the Minister for Finance and Coir of the Indian state of Kerala and a central committee member of the Communist Party of India (Marxist).

He represented the Alappuzha constituency in the Kerala Legislative Assembly. During his tenure as a member of the Kerala State Planning Board, he was in charge of the Peoples Planning in Kerala. He also served as the Finance Minister of Kerala from 2006 to 2011 and 2016 to 2021.

Biography
The son of T. P. Mathew and Saramma Mathew, Isaac obtained a PhD from the Centre for Development Studies. His PhD thesis is titled Class Struggle and Industrial Structure: A Study of Coir Weaving Industry in Kerala 1859 - 1980. While a student, he became involved in student politics, being involved with the Students Federation of India (SFI), an organisation which is politically linked with the Communist Party of India (Marxist). He has held posts in the SFI at college, district and state level.

Isaac was a professor at the Centre for Development Studies, Thiruvananthapuram and has published a number of articles and books.

Isaac is divorced from his wife Dr. Nata Duvvury who is currently a senior lecturer at National University of Ireland, Galway, Ireland. They have two daughters: Sara Duvisac, and Dora Duvisac.

Works

English
 Science for Social Revolution: The Experience of Kerala Shastra Sahithya Parishad With B. Ekbal (1989) 
 Democracy at work in an Indian industrial cooperative: the story of Kerala Dinesh Beedi With Richard W. Franke and Pyaralal Raghavan. Ithaca: Cornell University Press. 1998
 Kalliasseri experiment in local level planning With P. V. Unnikrishnan, T. Gangadharan, Sreekumar Chathopadhya, Lalitha Bhai Sathyan, and Ajay Kumar Varma. Trivandrum: Centre for Development Studies. Monograph Series: Kerala Research Programme on Local Level Development.1995
 Modernisation and employment: the coir industry in Kerala. With R. A. Van Stuijvenberg and K. N. Nair. Indo-Dutch Studies on Development Alternatives 10. New Delhi: SAGE Publications. 1992
Local Democracy and Development: People's campaign for decentralised planning in Kerala with Richard W. Franke. New Delhi: LeftWord Books. 2000
Building Alternatives: The Story of India's Oldest Construction Workers' Cooperative with Michelle Williams. New Delhi: LeftWord Books. 2017.

Malayalam
 The Withering Coconut (1985)
 Political Economy of Poverty (1985)
 Economics Crisis in the Capitalist World (1987)
 ABC of Political Economy (1987)
 The World Bank and IMF (1988)
 Kerala: Land and Man (1988) [Won the Kerala Sahitya Akademi Award for Scholarly Literature in 1989]
 Political Economy of Surrender (1992)
 Peoples Planning: Theory and Practice (1998)
 Peoples Planning: Questions and Answers (1998)
 Construction of False Consent : Critique of Malayalam Media 2000 - 2010 (with N. P. Chandrasekharan)

References
Citations

Notes

 
 

1952 births
Living people
Jawaharlal Nehru University alumni
Communist Party of India (Marxist) politicians from Kerala
20th-century Indian economists
Malayali politicians
Marxian economists
People from Alappuzha district
Kerala MLAs 2011–2016
Kerala MLAs 2016–2021
Malayalam-language writers
Indian male writers
Writers from Kerala
Indian political writers
English-language writers from India
20th-century Indian non-fiction writers
Recipients of the Kerala Sahitya Akademi Award